Epipristis pullusa is a moth of the family Geometridae. It is found in China (Henan).

The  length of the forewings is 17.5–18 mm for males and 19.5–20 mm for females. The wings are pale greenish brown, diffused with blackish scales.

Etymology
The specific name is derived from the Latin word pullus (meaning dark-colored or blackish).

References

Moths described in 2009
Pseudoterpnini